Ziyang Subdistrict is a subdistrict in Shangcheng District of Hangzhou, Zhejiang, China.

Etymology

Administrative division
As of 2020, the subdistrict is divided into twelve communities:

 Shiwukui Lane Community
 North Luomaying Community
 Rosy Clouds Ridge Community
 Houchao Gate Community
 Royal Ancestral Temple Community
 Muchang Lane Community
 Xingong Community
 phoenix Community
 Sea Tide Community
 Shangyangshijie Community​
 Spring River Community
 Yongjiang Community

Tourist attractions
Liubu Bridge is a historic stone arch bridge in the subdistrict.

References

Hangzhou